National Security Council is an advisory body to the President of South Korea on foreign, military and domestic policies related to national security.

Membership

References

1963 establishments in South Korea
Government of South Korea
South Korea